The Crazy Butch Gang was an American juvenile street gang active in the New York City underworld during the late nineteenth century. Largely active in Manhattan's Lower East Side, the group were widely known as the cities top pickpockets and sneak thieves during the "Gay Nineties" period. An early member of this gang would later become known as a prominent New York gangster Jack Zelig.

Crazy Butch
Simon Erenstoft, also known as Crazy Butch, was supposedly orphaned at age 8, abandoned by his parents in Manhattan, where he began pickpocketing. According to legend, he later found a dog, which he later named Rabbi, and trained it to snatch purses and bring them around the corner at Willett Street and Stanton Street where he would be waiting.

Crazy Butch Gang
In the early 1890s the gang began a "snatch racket", where a gang member would purposely drive his bicycle into a pedestrian and begin an argument. As a group had gathered to watch the argument the other gang members would pickpocket the crowd.  Then they would meet back at their headquarters on Forsyth Street on Manhattan's Lower East Side to divide up the money. 

The gang was allied to the Eastman Gang who were at almost constant war with the Five Points and Humpty Jackson Gangs between the late 1890s and early 1900s as they were incorporated into the Squab Wheelmen, an ally of Monk Eastman's organization. The gang broke up when Crazy Butch was killed by Harry the Soldier in a gunfight over a female shoplifter known as the Darby Kid.

References

Further reading
Ferrara, Eric. Gangsters, Murderers & Weirdos of The Lower East Side, Part 1, Part 1. Lulu.com, 2008. 
Keats, Charles. Magnificent Masquerade: The Strange Case of Dr. Coster and Mr. Musica. Funk & Wagnalls, 1964. 
Maffi, Mario. Gateway to the Promised Land: Ethnic Cultures on New York's Lower East Side. Rodopi, 1994. 

Former gangs in New York City